Anoplarchus purpurescens, commonly known as the high cockscomb, is a species of fish in the family Stichaeidae. A single subspecies, Anoplarchus purpurescens archolepis was proposed by Hubbs in 1927, but was rejected.

Range
It is found in the Pacific Ocean, from the Pribilof Islands in the north to Santa Rosa Island in the south (66°N - 32°N). It inhabits coastal areas, no deeper than 30 meters below the surface. It lives near the ocean floor and in the intertidal zone. This species can breathe air, allowing it to survive for 15–25 hours out of water if moist.

Description
This long-bodied fish may be grey, with olive overtones, or brown, potentially with reddish overtones. The belly is pale. Individuals have been found that were up to 20 cm long.

This species is sexually dimorphic. Females have more subdued colors, but show more green or brown patterns. Females have a yellow speckled cockscomb and lower surface of the head. In males these areas are pale and lack speckles. During breeding season males develop bright orange and reddish coloration on the fins.

Diet
The high cockscomb eats green algae, polychaete worms, crustaceans and mollusks.

Breeding
Eggs are laid between rocks and shells and guarded and fanned by the female.

Gallery

References

Xiphisterinae
Taxa described in 1861
Taxa named by Theodore Gill